Milagros is a Spanish village and municipality in the province of Burgos, part of the autonomous community of Castile and León. It has a population of approximately 502 people and is 10 km from Aranda de Duero. Milagros is in the comarca and wine region of the Ribera del Duero.

The name "Milagros" may be translated from Spanish by the English word, "miracles".

Notable people
 José Vela Zanetti

References

External links
Milagros - photos and information (Spanish)

Municipalities in the Province of Burgos